The 1974 South Carolina Gamecocks football team represented the University of South Carolina as an independent during in the 1974 NCAA Division I football season. Led by Paul Dietzel in his ninth and final season as head coach, the Gamecocks compiled a record of 4–7. The team played home games at Williams–Brice Stadium in Columbia, South Carolina.

Schedule

References

South Carolina
South Carolina Gamecocks football seasons
South Carolina Gamecocks football